Don Flinn (November 17, 1892 – March 9, 1959) played major league baseball for the Pittsburgh Pirates in 1917. He played just 14 games, all as an outfielder. He had a .297 batting average.

Sources

1892 births
1959 deaths
Major League Baseball outfielders
Pittsburgh Pirates players
Baseball players from Texas
Muskogee Mets players
Joplin Miners players
Guthrie Senators players
Henryetta Boosters players
Newnan Cowetas players
Atlanta Crackers players
Norfolk Tars players
Waco Navigators players
San Antonio Bronchos players
Shreveport Gassers players
Dallas Marines players
Dallas Submarines players
Waco Indians players
Austin Rangers players
Springfield Midgets players
Marshall Indians players
Jonesboro Buffaloes players
Gulfport Tarpons players